Antichlidas is a genus of moths belonging to the subfamily Olethreutinae of the family Tortricidae.

Species
Antichlidas holocnista Meyrick, in Caradja, 1931
Antichlidas trigonia Zhang & Li, 2004

See also
List of Tortricidae genera

References

 , 2005: World Catalogue of Insects, 5
 , 2004: Taxonomic Study on the Genus Antichlidas (Lepidoptera: Tortricidae: Olethreutinae), with Description of a New Species. Entomotaxonomia 26 (3): 193-196. Abstract: .

External links
tortricidae.com

Eucosmini
Tortricidae genera
Taxa named by Edward Meyrick